The 1 μm process (1 micrometre process) is a level of MOSFET semiconductor process technology that was commercialized around the 1984–1986 timeframe, by leading semiconductor companies like NTT, NEC, Intel and IBM. It was the first process where CMOS was common (as opposed to NMOS).

The earliest MOSFET with a 1μm NMOS channel length was fabricated by a research team led by Robert H. Dennard, Hwa-Nien Yu and F.H. Gaensslen at the IBM T.J. Watson Research Center in 1974.

Products featuring 1.0 μm manufacturing process
 NTT introduced the 1μm process for its DRAM memory chips, including its 64kin 1979 and 256kin 1980.
 NEC's 1Mbit DRAM memory chip was manufactured with the 1μm process in 1984.
 Intel 80386 CPU launched in 1985 was manufactured using this process.

References

External links
Brief timeline of microprocessor development

01000